Tehilla Blad (born September 5, 1995 in Uppsala) is a Swedish actress, singer, swimmer and ballet dancer best known for playing the young Lisbeth Salander in the Swedish Millennium films.

Biography
Tehilla is the sixth child in a family with eight children who all are focusing on music, dance, swimming and acting. In year 2008 the sibling group, who calls themselves BBx8 (B-B times eight), came to the semifinals in Sweden's Got Talent (Talang 2008). Tehilla graduated from the Royal Swedish Ballet in Stockholm in June 2015.

Career
In 2005, Tehilla participated in the TV miniseries Kvalster (Mites) which went into four episodes on Swedish Television (SVT). She has since then appeared in both children and adult films/TV shows, in particular, Ella in two places (SVT), Dra mig baklänges! (SVT), The Girl with the Dragon Tattoo, The Girl Who Played with Fire and The Girl Who Kicked the Hornets' Nest.

In the fall of 2009, Tehilla shouldered a greater role in the Pernilla August film Beyond where she and Noomi Rapace play the main character Leena (child and adult). The film was first shown in public on the Critic's Week at Venice Film Festival 2010, where it won the Critic's Week's award. The premiere in Sweden was December 10, 2010.

Filmography

Awards

External links
 
 

Swedish film actresses
Swedish television actresses
Swedish ballet dancers
Swedish female dancers
Swedish female swimmers
1995 births
Living people
21st-century Swedish singers
21st-century Swedish women singers